Katherine Lapp is the executive vice president and chief administrative officer of Harvard University.  Boston Magazine named Lapp Boston's 42nd Most Powerful Person in 2015.

Career
In 2015, Boston Magazine named Lapp Boston's 42nd Most Powerful Person. According to the magazine, "Lapp is overseeing Harvard (University)'s ambitious 10-year development plan in Allston, and having joined Massachusetts Governor (Charlie) Baker's MBTA advisory panel, she'll help determine Boston's transportation future as well."

Previously, Lapp was executive vice president for business operations for the University of California.  Prior to becoming a University executive, Lapp had a distinguished career in leadership roles in city and state government in New York, including serving as executive director and chief executive officer of the Metropolitan Transportation Authority, North America's largest regional transportation network.  She was appointed to the position by former New York State Governor George Pataki in 2002 and served until the end of the Pataki Administration in 2006.  As head of the MTA, she oversaw the New York City mass transit system, Metro North, the Long Island Rail Road, and several bridges and tunnels.  She was MTA Executive Director during the 2005 New York City Transit Strike.

Prior to joining the MTA, Lapp served as New York state director of criminal justice and commissioner of the criminal justice services department from 1997 to 2001, New York City Mayor Rudy Giuliani's criminal justice coordinator from 1994 to 1997, and chief of staff and special counsel to the deputy mayor for public safety for New York City Mayor David Dinkins from 1990 to 1993.

Education
Lapp received her B.A. in 1978 from Fairfield University and her J.D. in 1981 from Hofstra University Deane School of Law.

References

External links
The Office of the Executive Vice President - Harvard University

State cabinet secretaries of New York (state)
Women in New York (state) politics
Fairfield University alumni
Harvard University administrators
University of California staff
Maurice A. Deane School of Law alumni
Living people
Directors of Harvard Management Company
Executives of Metropolitan Transportation Authority (New York)
Women academic administrators
American academic administrators
Year of birth missing (living people)
People from Cedarhurst, New York
21st-century American women